HMS Tweed may refer to any one of several Royal Navy ships named for the River Tweed, including:

HMS Tweed was an  ordered and laid down in 1795, but was renamed  on 30 October 1795 before her launch in 1796. 
, a ship-sloop wrecked in 1813.
, a 28-gun sixth-rate frigate built in 1823 at Portsmouth and sold in 1852. 
, a torpedo gunboat.
,  of 1,460 tons displacement launched about 1943 and sunk on 7 January 1944 during the Second World War.

Royal Navy ship names